Žabnik may refer to:

Žabnik, Međimurje County, a village in northern Croatia
Žabnik, Varaždin County, a village near Trnovec Bartolovečki in northern Croatia